Square the Circle (stylized as SQUARE THE CIRCLE) is an unreleased album by J-pop singer Mami Kawada. It was released on August 8, 2012 by Geneon Universal Entertainment. The album includes thirteen tracks which includes her singles "No Buts!", "See Visions" and "Serment".

The album came in a limited CD+Blu-ray edition (GNCV-1030) and a regular CD-only edition (GNCV-1031). The limited edition also includes the music videos of "Hishoku no Sora", "Seed" and "Portamento".

The album has been a commercial success, reaching the peak position of #22 on the Oricon Albums Chart.

Track listing
SQUARE THE CIRCLE—5:25
Composition/Arrangement: Takase Kazuya
No Buts!—3:37
Composition: Nakazawa Tomoyuki
Arrangement: Nakazawa Tomoyuki, Ozaki Takeshi
my buddy—4:30
Composition: Nakazawa Tomoyuki
Arrangement: Nakazawa Tomoyuki, Ozaki Takeshi
Don’t stop me now!—4:07
Composition/Arrangement: Iuchi Maiko
Clap!Clap!Clap!—4:31
Composition: Ozaki Takeshi
Arrangement: Nakazawa Tomoyuki, Ozaki Takeshi
Usual…—3:38
Composition/Arrangement: Kawada Mami, Nakazawa Tomoyuki, Ozaki Takeshi
See visionS—5:24
Composition/Arrangement: Iuchi Maiko
live a lie—6:21
Composition/Arrangement: C.G mix
Midnight trip // memories of childhood—4:11
Composition/Arrangement: Takase Kazuya
—4:47
Composition/Arrangement: Iuchi Maiko
F—5:50
Composition/Arrangement: NakaZaki Mai (Nakazawa + Ozaki + Maiko)
Going back to square one—3:50
Composition: Ozaki Takeshi
Arrangement: Nakazawa Tomoyuki, Ozaki Takeshi
Serment—4:10
Composition: Nakazawa Tomoyuki
Arrangement: Nakazawa Tomoyuki, Ozaki Takeshi

References

2012 albums